Revelation Theory EP is the first EP by Rev Theory, who were at the time known as Revelation Theory, released in 2004 independently. The songs have a rougher sound, as this was likely a demo.

Track listing
"Deep Six" - 3:36
"Undone" - 3:39
"Fade" - 4:10
"Loathe" - 3:46
"Over It All" - 3:51
"Far from Home" - 3:20

References

2004 debut EPs
Rev Theory EPs